Japan–Namibia relations are the bilateral relationship between Japan and Namibia.  Japan maintains an embassy in Windhoek and Namibia maintains an embassy in Tokyo.

History 
Diplomatic relations were established on 21 March 1990, exactly the same day as the Independence Day of Namibia. In this year, the Ceremony of the Enthronement and the Great Thanksgiving Service were held at the Tokyo Imperial Palace, Namibian Minister of Foreign Affairs Theo-Ben Gurirab as the foreign representative attended with his wife.

On 25 August 2017, the Cabinet of Japan froze the assets of two Namibian firms who were trading with North Korea.

Academic relationship 
The University of Namibia cooperates with two Japanese universities; Tokyo University of Marine Science and Technology and Kogakuin University.

See also 
 Foreign relations of Japan
 Foreign relations of Namibia

References

External links 
 Embassy of Japan in Namibia
 Embassy of Namibia in Japan

Namibia
Bilateral relations of Namibia